Harold Chamberlain "Hal" Banks (February 28, 1909 – September 24, 1985) from Waterloo, Iowa was a controversial labour union leader in Canada. An American with mob connections, he came to Canada in 1949 to help bust purportedly Communist-controlled Canadian Seaman's Union and establish the Seafarers International Union as their replacement.

He remained in Canada until 1964, when he returned to the United States rather than face criminal charges stemming from a physical assault on a rival union leader. The Pearson government took control of the union and pressed charges against him. The Canadian government filed an extradition request, which was refused by U.S. President Lyndon B. Johnson.

At the time, a conspiracy was alleged that the Canadian government purposefully allowed Banks to escape and only charged him in offences that would not qualify him for extradition from the United States.  It almost caused the fall of the Liberal government in Parliament.  A news team found him living in a yacht in New York City.

In 1985, Canadian documentary filmmaker Donald Brittain made a film about Banks, Canada's Sweetheart: The Saga of Hal C. Banks. Maury Chaykin played Banks in historical reenactments. A 1988 book by Canadian author Peter Edwards, "Waterfront Warlord" corrected several errors in the film, including the implication that Banks had his nemesis John Droeger killed.

See also

Canadian Merchant Navy
 Seafarers International Union of Canada
 Seafarers International Union of North America

Notes

External links

Canadian trade unionists
Trade unionists from Iowa
People from Waterloo, Iowa
1909 births
1985 deaths
American emigrants to Canada